NGC 2108 is a globular cluster located in the constellation of Dorado. NGC 2108 was discovered in 1835 by John Herschel.

See also
Globular Cluster

References

External links
NGC 2108 on SIMBAD

Astronomical objects discovered in 1835
2108
Globular clusters
Dorado (constellation)